Giovanni Battista Zupi or Zupus (2 November 1589 – 26 August 1667) was an Italian astronomer, mathematician, and Jesuit priest.

He was born in Catanzaro. In 1639, Giovanni was the first person to discover that the planet Mercury had orbital phases, like those of the Moon and Venus. His observations demonstrated that the planet orbited around the Sun. This occurred thirty years after Galileo's first telescope design, and Zupi's was only slightly more powerful. He died in Naples.

The crater Zupus on the Moon is named after him.

See also
List of Jesuit scientists
List of Roman Catholic scientist-clerics

References

1590s births
1650 deaths
People from Catanzaro
17th-century Italian astronomers
17th-century Italian Jesuits
17th-century Italian mathematicians
Jesuit scientists